Steven Michael Mesler (born August 28, 1978) is an American bobsledder. He is the co-founder, President and CEO of the international award-winning non-profit education organization Classroom Champions. Mesler also currently serves on the Board of Directors for the United States Olympic Committee.

Early life and sport career
Mesler was born in Buffalo, New York, and is Jewish on his mother's side. He attended City Honors School in Buffalo, graduating in 1996.

Mesler attended the University of Florida in Gainesville, Florida, where he competed as a decathlete for the Florida Gators track and field team from 1997 to 2000.  He graduated from the University of Florida with a bachelor's degree, with honors, in exercise and sports science in 2000.

Mesler won a gold medal as a pusher for driver Steve Holcomb's U.S. Olympic team in the four-man event at the 2010 Winter Olympics. This was the first gold medal for the United States in 62 years.

Mesler's team finished seventh in the four-man event at Turin in 2006.  He won two medals in the four-man event at the FIBT World Championships with a gold in 2009, a first in 50 years for the United States, and a bronze in 2004.

In March 2011, he was inducted into the National Jewish Sports Hall of Fame and in October 2011 he was inducted into the Buffalo Sports Hall of Fame.

Classroom Champions 
In 2009, Mesler and his sister, Dr. Leigh Mesler Parise, founded Classroom Champions and have grown it into an international organization affecting change in classrooms and donating needed technology utilizing Olympians and Paralympians as around the year mentors to thousands of students in the U.S., Canada, and Costa Rica.

For his work on Classroom Champions, Mesler was named one of Sports Illustrated'''s renowned "Athletes Who Care" and was a 2011 Nominee for the International Champion for Peace Award by Peace and Sport. A TED-Ed Educator and featured expert on Big Think, Steve has spoken around the world on the values of educating students through technology and mentorship. In 2013, Classroom Champions was the only non-European organization to receive a Fair Play Diploma from the International Fair Play Committee established by UNESCO. Recently, local agencies, the United States Olympic Committee, and the White House have all recognized Classroom Champions teachers for their work.

Classroom Champions has been featured in publications such as:
Forbes, Sports Illustrated, Sports Illustrated for Kids, ABC News, the Washington Post, The Sporting News, USA Today, and the Yahoo Sports.

 Corporate consulting and speaking 
Mesler's teaching extends beyond the schools of the world and into corporate board rooms where he is a leadership development consultant as a Principal at Shift210 Consulting. He works with small businesses as well as multi-national corporations to increase employee development, retention, leadership abilities, team performance and community involvement engagement.

Mesler has keynoted executive conferences and national conventions from Vancouver to Orlando. He has spoken on communicating the Olympic ideals in Olympia, Greece, talked about engagement in Tel Aviv, Israel, and sat as an expert on panels in Sochi, Russia and Dubai, UAE to discuss the future of organizations in creating peace through sport education in global communities. In March 2014, Mesler spoke at the Global Education and Skills Forum in Dubai with a talk titled "Systematic change means getting back to local." Other speakers at the conference included Tony Blair and Bill Clinton, among others.

 Television experience 
Mesler is a noted TV host and commentator. He has commentated on NBCUniversal for the 2009, 2011, and 2012 Bobsled World Championships as well as numerous World Cup races around the globe. Steve has co-hosted Calgary's Breakfast Television morning show on multiple occasions and, notably, has appeared on American television shows the Late Show with David Letterman, the Today Show, and The Colbert Report''.

Other philanthropic work
Mesler has consistently donated his time to organization of various charitable good. He is currently active or has been active with the following organizations to raise awareness, raise impact, and or raise funds nationally as well as in his hometown of Buffalo, NY and residence of Calgary, AB: Ronald McDonald House, Make a Wish Foundation, Roswell Park Comprehensive Cancer Center, Peace and Sport, Right To Play.

In November 2014, Mesler received the Athletes in Excellence Award from The Foundation for Global Sports Development, in recognition of his community service efforts and work with youth.

See also 

 Florida Gators
 List of Olympic medalists in bobsleigh
 List of University of Florida alumni
 List of University of Florida Olympians

References

External links 
 
 
 
 US Bobsleigh and Skeleton Federation announcement of the US Olympic men's bobsleigh team. January 17, 2010. Accessed January 18, 2010.
 LinkedIn Profile
 Classroom Champions

1978 births
Living people
American male bobsledders
American male decathletes
Bobsledders at the 2006 Winter Olympics
Bobsledders at the 2010 Winter Olympics
Florida Gators men's track and field athletes
Jewish American sportspeople
Olympic gold medalists for the United States in bobsleigh
Sportspeople from Buffalo, New York
Medalists at the 2010 Winter Olympics
21st-century American Jews